This article lists the chiefs of the General Staff of the Argentine Navy and their preceding offices, between 1958 and the present day. The Argentine Navy is the naval force of Argentina.

The current Chief of the Navy General Staff is Rear Admiral Julio Guardia. He was appointed by President Alberto Fernández on 28 February 2020 by Decree 179/2020.

List

See also

Argentine Navy
Chief of the General Staff of the Argentine Army
Chief of the General Staff of the Argentine Air Force

References

Argentine Navy officers
Argentine Navy admirals
Argentine military-related lists
Argentina